Gabon competed at the 2020 Summer Olympics in Tokyo. Originally scheduled to take place from 24 July to 9 August 2020, the Games were postponed to 23 July to 8 August 2021, because of the COVID-19 pandemic. It was the nation's eleventh appearance at the Summer Olympics.

Competitors
The following is the list of number of competitors in the Games.

Athletics

Gabon received universality slots from IAAF to send one athletes to the Olympics.

Track & road events

Judo

Gabon qualified one judoka for the women's half-heavyweight category (78 kg) at the Games. Sarah-Myriam Mazouz accepted a continental berth from Africa as the nation's top-ranked judoka outside of direct qualifying position in the IJF World Ranking List of June 28, 2021.

Swimming

Gabon received a universality invitation from FINA to send two top-ranked swimmers (one per gender) in their respective individual events to the Olympics, based on the FINA Points System of June 28, 2021.

Taekwondo

Gabon entered one athlete into the taekwondo competition at the Games. London 2012 silver medalist and 2013 world champion Anthony Obame secured a spot in the men's heavyweight category (+80 kg) with a top two finish at the 2020 African Qualification Tournament in Rabat, Morocco.

References

Nations at the 2020 Summer Olympics
2020
2021 in Gabonese sport